Chipping Norton School is a mixed secondary school with academy status located in Chipping Norton, Oxfordshire, United Kingdom. It is attended by 1000 students, with 200 in Sixth Form. It has no specific religious denomination and is a non-boarding, Arts and Science college. The school joined the River Learning Trust, a multi-academy trust on 1 March 2017.

The current head teacher is Barry Doherty, who replaced Simon Duffy from September 2018.

New Science Block, 2011 
The School extended to include a new 3-floor Science Block in 2011. It is next to the town's Leisure Centre and replaced a car park which used to be there.

The building of the new Science Block also came with the building of a new entrance.

Ofsted
Chipping Norton School has had three full inspections carried out by Ofsted since 2012.

 2012: The school was judged to be 'Good' overall and achieved a '2' in every marking category (on a scale of 1–4, 1 being exceptional and 4 being inadequate). They determined that the Sixth Form was also 'Good', and that the headteacher, Simon Duffy, was clearly pushing to raise the school's rating further.
 2015: This was the first inspection after the school had gained academy status, and was deemed to be 'Inadequate' overall, with the Sixth Form still being rated 'Good'. The report found that attendance was below national averages and attainment of students was also below expectations.
 2017: The report now deemed the school to be 'Good' and the Sixth Form to be 'Outstanding'. This was the last report under headteacher Simon Duffy.

Notable pupils
Walter Padley (1916-1984), President of the Union of Shop, Distributive and Allied Workers 1948–1964, Member of Parliament 1950–1979, Minister of State for Foreign Affairs 1964–1967, Labour Party chairman 1965–1966.
Lloyd Sabin (born 1994), cricketer

Headmasters/headteachers

References

External links
Chipping Norton School website
Ex pupils website

Secondary schools in Oxfordshire
Educational institutions established in 1928
1928 establishments in England
Academies in Oxfordshire
Chipping Norton